The  is a 30.9 km Japanese railway line which connects Yatomi Station in Yatomi, Aichi with Tamanoi Station in Ichinomiya, Aichi. It is owned and operated by the private railway operator Nagoya Railroad (Meitetsu).

Stations

History

The Yatomi to Tsushima section was opened in 1898 by the Bisai Railway, and was extended to Ichinomiya in 1900. In 1914, the line was extended to Tamanoi and Kisogawa-Bashi (since closed), and a freight-only line to Kiso-Minato opened in 1918. 

The Kiso-Minato to Morikami section was electrified at 600 V DC in 1922, and extended to Yatomi the following year. The company merged with Meitetsu in 1925.

In 1948, the voltage on the Yatomi to Tsushima section was raised to 1,500 V DC, with this increase extended to the rest of the line in 1952. The Kiso-Minato to Tamanoi section closed in 1959. The Tsushima to Morikami section was double-tracked between 1967 and 1974.

References
This article incorporates material from the corresponding article in the Japanese Wikipedia.

Rail transport in Aichi Prefecture
Bisai Line
Railway lines opened in 1914
1067 mm gauge railways in Japan